William John Addison Beynon, KC (December 21, 1877 – June 8, 1968) was a Canadian politician and barrister. He was elected to the House of Commons of Canada in 1930 as a Member of the Conservative Party to represent the riding of Moose Jaw. He was defeated in the 1935 election. He died at his home in Winnipeg in 1968.

References

External links

1877 births
1968 deaths
Conservative Party of Canada (1867–1942) MPs
Members of the House of Commons of Canada from Saskatchewan
People from King, Ontario
Canadian King's Counsel
Lawyers in Saskatchewan